John J. Anderson or J.J. Anderson (November 8, 1956 – October 17, 1989) was a writer and editor covering computers and technology. The New Jersey native was Executive Editor of Computer Shopper and Atari Explorer. At the time of his death he was an editor for MacUser magazine in Foster City, California. He was 33, and was survived by a wife, Lauren Hallquist Anderson, and two children.

John began writing the "Apple Cart" column in Creative Computing magazine in January 1983 after David Lubar left to work for a video game company in California. He followed this with the "Outpost Atari" column in the same magazine. John would become Creative's Executive Editor, working alongside founding editors David Ahl and Betsy Staples.

Death and legacy 
John and fellow MacUser editor Derek van Alstyne were killed in San Francisco during the Loma Prieta earthquake. They were visiting the city for a business meeting when the front of a building collapsed, burying his car in debris from a brick wall. MacUser named two of its annual Editors' Choice Awards, celebrating distinguished achievement and up-and-coming talent, respectively, after the pair. On October 31, 1989, the John Anderson Memorial Fund was established by Ziff Davis as a trust fund for John's two children. Bill Ziff, President of Ziff, personally contributed $50,000.

References 

American magazine editors
1956 births
1989 deaths
Writers from New Jersey
Writers from California
20th-century American non-fiction writers